Cezar Andrei Lungu (born 6 April 1988), is a Romanian professional footballer. He has previously played for Steaua București, Sportul Studențesc, Politehnica Iași, Academica Clinceni, Dunărea Călărași and Romania U-21.

Honours

Steaua București
Romanian Cup: 2010–11

Dunărea Călărași
Liga II: 2017–18

References

External links
 
 

1988 births
Living people
Sportspeople from Târgoviște
Romanian footballers
Association football goalkeepers
Liga I players
Liga II players
FC Steaua București players
FC Politehnica Iași (2010) players
FC Astra Giurgiu players
FC Sportul Studențesc București players
LPS HD Clinceni players
FC Dunărea Călărași players
FC Petrolul Ploiești players
CS Concordia Chiajna players
FC Brașov (2021) players